Abel Lizotte (April 13, 1870, in Lewiston, Maine – December 4, 1926, in Wilkes-Barre, Pennsylvania) was a Major League Baseball first baseman who played for the Pittsburgh Pirates in 1896.

He made his major league debut on September 17, 1896, and he played in his final game on September 26 of that year. In seven big league games, he hit .103 with three runs scored and three RBI. He collected three hits in 29 at bats.

Lizotte also spent 10 seasons in the minor leagues, hitting .292 in 1,023 games. In 1895, with the Wilkes-Barre Coal Barons, Lizotte hit .333 with 111 runs and 29 triples in 109 games. In 1901, with the Wheeling Stogies, Lizotte hit .330 in 127 games. In 1907 and 1908, he managed the minor league Wilkes-Barre Barons.

He was interred at St. Mary Cemetery in Wilkes-Barre following his death.

References

External links

Major League Baseball first basemen
Pittsburgh Pirates players
Baseball players from Maine
Sportspeople from Lewiston, Maine
1870 births
1926 deaths
19th-century baseball players
Minor league baseball managers
Lewiston (minor league baseball) players
Wilkes-Barre Coal Barons players
Syracuse Stars (minor league baseball) players
Montreal Royals players
Wheeling Stogies players
Peoria Distillers players
St. Joseph Saints players
Albany Senators players
Mansfield Giants players
Wilkes-Barre Barons (baseball) players
Baseball coaches from Maine